The 1994 IGA Tennis Classic was a women's tennis tournament played on indoor hard courts at The Greens Country Club in Oklahoma City, Oklahoma in the United States that was part of Tier III of the 1994 WTA Tour. It was the 9th edition of the tournament was held from February 14 through February 20, 1994. Unseeded Meredith McGrath won the singles title and earned $27,000 first-prize money.

Finals

Singles

 Meredith McGrath defeated  Brenda Schultz 7–6(8–6), 7–6(7–4)
 It was McGrath's first singles title of her career.

Doubles

 Patty Fendick /  Meredith McGrath defeated  Katrina Adams /  Manon Bollegraf 7–6(7–3), 6–2
 It was Fendick's 2nd title of the year and the 25th of her career. It was McGrath's 3rd title of the year and the 12th of her career.

References

External links
 ITF tournament edition details
 Tournament draws

IGA Classic
U.S. National Indoor Championships
IGA Tennis Classic
IGA Tennis Classic
IGA Tennis Classic